Charles Alan Weber Jr. (born September 20, 1978) is an American actor and former model. In 2014, Weber began starring as Frank Delfino in the ABC legal drama series, How to Get Away with Murder.

Early life 
Weber was born in Jefferson City, Missouri. He dropped out of college after a year and moved to New York City when he was 19 years old to study at the Stella Adler Studio of Acting. As a model, Weber appeared in the Christmas 1998 Abercrombie & Fitch catalog when photographer Bruce Weber revitalized the publication.

Career
Weber made his screen debut in the 2000 film The Broken Hearts Club: A Romantic Comedy. Later that same year he was cast in the recurring role of Ben on the TV series Buffy the Vampire Slayer. Weber appeared in 14 episodes of the series from 2000 to 2001. He later guest-starred on The Drew Carey Show, Charmed, Veronica Mars, House, Burn Notice, Bones, Warehouse 13 and CSI: Crime Scene Investigation.

From 2003 to 2004, Weber had roles in the direct-to-video films Gacy, The Kiss and Cruel Intentions 3.  In 2010, he co-starred in the vampire-spoof film Vampires Suck. From 2003 to 2004 he had a recurring role of Jay in another The WB drama series, Everwood. From 2012 to 2013 he appeared in the MTV comedy-drama series, Underemployed, and later had a recurring role on the fifth season of The CW teen drama, 90210.

In 2014, Weber was cast in the series regular role in the ABC legal drama series, How to Get Away with Murder produced by Shonda Rhimes. He played the role of Frank Delfino, an associate of Viola Davis' character.

Weber played Christian Vance, owner of Vance Publishing, in the 2020 romance film sequel After We Collided.

Filmography

References

External links 
 
 

1978 births
Living people
People from Jefferson City, Missouri
American male film actors
American male television actors
Male models from Missouri
21st-century American male actors
Male actors from Missouri
20th-century American male actors